White Marsh Branch is a  long 2nd order tributary to the Nanticoke River in Sussex County, Delaware.

Course
White Marsh Branch rises at Farmington, Delaware in Kent County and then flows south into Sussex County to join the Nanticoke River about 0.5 miles northeast of Greenwood, Delaware.

Watershed
White Marsh Branch drains  of area, receives about 45.3 in/year of precipitation, has a topographic wetness index of 703.88 and is about 4% forested.

See also
List of Delaware rivers

References

Rivers of Delaware
Rivers of Sussex County, Delaware
Rivers of Kent County, Delaware
Tributaries of the Nanticoke River